is a Japanese badminton player. He was the mixed doubles gold medalist at the 2013 Asian Youth Games partnered with Akane Yamaguchi. Koga was part of the national junior team that won the bronze medals at the 2014 Asian and World Junior Championships. Koga who educated at the Waseda University was the men's singles champion at the 68 National University Championships. He was the runner-up at the 2018 Canada Open.

Achievements

Asian Youth Games 
Mixed doubles

BWF World Tour (1 runner-up) 
The BWF World Tour, which was announced on 19 March 2017 and implemented in 2018, is a series of elite badminton tournaments sanctioned by the Badminton World Federation (BWF). The BWF World Tours are divided into levels of World Tour Finals, Super 1000, Super 750, Super 500, Super 300 (part of the HSBC World Tour), and the BWF Tour Super 100.

Men's singles

BWF International Challenge/Series (3 titles, 2 runners-up) 
Men's singles

  BWF International Challenge tournament
  BWF International Series tournament

References

External links 
 

Living people
1996 births
Sportspeople from Fukuoka Prefecture
Japanese male badminton players
21st-century Japanese people